Sihame El Kaouakibi (born 9 July 1986) is a Belgian politician and the founder of the Let's Go Urban project. In 2021, she was accused of fraudulent use of government subsidies. Almost 1 million euro is claimed to have been used for her own profit.

Biography
El Kaouakibi grew up in Boom as one of seven children. In 2009 El Kaouakibi founded Let's Go Urban, in 2013 Youth and Urban Projects and in 2014 A Woman's View. In 2014 she was nominated as a member of the board of directors of the Flemish Radio and Television Broadcasting Organisation by the political party OpenVLD. In 2019 the OpenVld placed her on their electoral list for the Flemish Parliament. She was elected with 10704 votes.
In 2021 she left the party after the financial scandal broke lose. Currently, she is still active in the Flemish parliament as an independent politician, but has been on sick leave since October 2020.

Financial scandals 
In February 2021 an inquiry was opened for potential financial fraud at her organisation Let's Go Urban. An independent audit was performed and several obscure financial constructions were found. Following the potential problems found by the audit, the city of Antwerp opened an investigation regarding several thousands in subsidies given to Let's Go Urban to figure out what happened with the money. 
In addition to the above investigations, the public prosecutor's office of Antwerp also opened an investigation regarding the potential fraud by El Kaouakibi. 

El Kaouakibi herself filed a complaint against unknown persons. According to her, documents were adjusted and leaked to the press.

On 28 March VTM Nieuws provided evidence of potential fraud with invoices. In a preliminary report, a potential of 450,000 euro in subsidies was embezzled from Let's Go Urban to El Kaouakibi's private accounts.

Based on the preliminary report regarding potential embezzlement, the Federal Public Service Interior started an investigation regarding subsidies given to WeLoveBxl, the Brussels branch of Let's Go Urban.

In early April 2021 the city of Antwerp had the assets of El Kaouakibi seized after reports that she wanted to sell real estate. A new audit from the city of Antwerp showed that 350,000 euro was embezzled.

Awards 
 2018: Global Diversity Award by Stanton Chase.

References

External links

21st-century Belgian politicians
Living people
1986 births
Vrije Universiteit Brussel alumni
21st-century Belgian women politicians